Capurro is a barrio (neighbourhood or district) of Montevideo, Uruguay, and part of the Capurro–Bella Vista composite barrio, with Artigas Boulevard separating the two.

Location
Capurro shares borders with La Teja to the north west, Prado to the north east, Bella Vista to the south east and it borders the Bay of Montevideo to the south west.

History 
The early history of the area was marked by the trade of slaves from Africa. Slave trading ships had first arrived in Montevideo in 1743.  The Spanish company Real Compañía de Filipinas, after its first such import in 1787, was forced by the government to build quaranteen barracks for the slaves, for the protection from epidemic diseases.  These barracks, that came to be known as "Caserío de los Negros", were built in the coast of Capurro. After the declaration of Independence, they were demolished.

The name and foundation of Capurro are related to the Genoan mariner Giovanni Battista Capurro. He arrived in the country at the time of the first Constitution and acquired coastal land in this area around 1830. His home, which was surrounded by wonderful gardens, took on the name "Mecca". The area he acquired was rich in springs and wells of fresh water and had a lot of sand. Capurro started selling fresh water to ships returning to Europe, as well as sand for ballast, causing the sand of the beach to dwindle away.

In 1869, the "Compañía de Tranvías al Paso del Molino y Cerro" established a line of horsecars which connected Montevideo with the Villa del Cerro. This line brought many visitors to the area around the beach, which was called Playa Honda, transforming it into a relaxation and recreation area. The sons of Capurro started planning to build a big hotel, but the economic crisis of the 1890s stopped their plans. Instead, in 1910, a park was founded in its place, called Parque Capurro. It was designed by the Italian architect Giovanni Veltroni.

See also 
Barrios of Montevideo

References

External links 

 Intendencia de Montevideo / Historia del Capurro
 Revista Raices / Historia del barrio Cordón

 
Barrios of Montevideo